Balintore can refer to several places in Scotland:
Balintore, Easter Ross, a village in Easter Ross
 Balintore F.C., an association football club in Balintore, Easter Ross
Balintore, Angus, a village in Angus
Balintore Castle, a castle in Angus